Coscinum clavipes is a species of ulidiid or picture-winged fly in the genus Coscinum of the family Tephritidae.

References

Ulidiidae